Agave mckelveyana, common name McKelvey's century plant, is a species endemic to west-central Arizona, at elevations of .

Agave mckelveyana is an acaulescent (trunkless) species, usually producing a single rosette but sometimes growing suckers.

References

mckelveyana
Flora of Arizona